The 2015–16 Detroit Pistons season was the 75th season of the franchise, the 68th in the National Basketball Association (NBA), and the 59th in the Detroit suburban area. This season marked the first time the Pistons qualified for the NBA playoffs since the 2008–09 season, and also marked their first winning season since the 2007–08 season. The Pistons would also end their record as the team in the Eastern Conference with the longest active postseason drought at seven seasons. The Pistons were the first team with a winning percentage above .500 at the Eastern Conference's 8th seed since the 2011–12 Philadelphia 76ers.

In the playoffs, the Pistons were swept by the eventual NBA champion Cleveland Cavaliers in four games in the First Round. 

The Pistons would not make another playoff appearance until 2019.

Draft picks

Roster

Standings

Division

Conference

Pre-season

|- style="background:#fbb;"
| 1 
| October 6
| Indiana
| 
| Stanley Johnson (26)
| Andre Drummond (9)
| Caldwell-Pope, Dinwiddie, Johnson & Bullock (4)
| The Palace of Auburn Hills10,446
| 0–1
|- style="background:#fbb;"
| 2 
| October 8
| Brooklyn
| 
| Ersan İlyasova (15)
| Andre Drummond (11)
| Reggie Jackson (6)
| The Palace of Auburn Hills10,019
| 0–2
|- style="background:#bfb;"
| 3 
| October 10
| @ Milwaukee
| 
| Marcus Morris (21)
| Andre Drummond (7)
| Jackson & Dinwiddie (8)
| BMO Harris Bradley Center7,350
| 1–2
|- style="background:#fbb;"
| 4 
| October 13
| @ Indiana
| 
| Drummond, Jackson & İlyasova (17)
| Andre Drummond (21)
| Reggie Jackson (7)
| Bankers Life Fieldhouse12,730
| 1–3
|- style="background:#bfb;"
| 5
| October 14
| @ Chicago
| 
| Reggie Jackson (20)
| Andre Drummond (10)
| Johnson, Tolliver, Bullock, Dinwiddie & Meeks (4)
| United Center21,713
| 2–3
|- style="background:#fbb;"
| 6 
| October 18
| @ San Antonio
| 
| Reggie Jackson (20)
| Andre Drummond (15)
| Reggie Jackson (9)
| AT&T Center17,396
| 2–4
|- style="background:#fbb;"
| 7 
| October 21
| Charlotte
| 
| Andre Drummond (21)
| Andre Drummond (15)
| Reggie Jackson (11)
| The Palace of Auburn Hills11,096
| 2–5
|- style="background:#bfb;"
| 8 
| October 23
| Atlanta
| 
| Stanley Johnson (20)
| Marcus Morris (10)
| Steve Blake (12)
| The Palace of Auburn Hills12,804
| 3–5

Regular season

Game log

|- style="background:#bfb;"
| 1
| October 27
| @ Atlanta
| 
| Kentavious Caldwell-Pope (21)
| Andre Drummond (19)
| Reggie Jackson (5)
| Philips Arena19,187
| 1–0
|- style="background:#bfb;"
| 2
| October 28
| Utah
| 
| Reggie Jackson (19)
| Andre Drummond (10)
| Steve Blake (7)
| Palace of Auburn Hills18,434
| 2–0
|- style="background:#bfb;"
| 3
| October 30
| Chicago
| 
| Marcus Morris (26)
| Andre Drummond (20)
| Reggie Jackson (7)
| Palace of Auburn Hills16,035
| 3–0

|- style="background:#fbb;"
| 4
| November 3
| Indiana
| 
| Andre Drummond (25)
| Andre Drummond (29)
| Reggie Jackson (6)
| Palace of Auburn Hills13,325
| 3–1
|- style="background:#bfb;"
| 5
| November 6
| @ Phoenix
| 
| Reggie Jackson (23)
| Andre Drummond (17)
| Reggie Jackson (7)
| Talking Stick Resort Arena16,676
| 4–1
|- style="background:#bfb;"
| 6
| November 8
| @ Portland
| 
| Reggie Jackson (40)
| Andre Drummond (27)
| Reggie Jackson (5)
| Moda Center19,393
| 5–1
|- style="background:#fbb;"
| 7
| November 9
| @ Golden State
| 
| Jackson & Johnson (20)
| Andre Drummond (15)
| Reggie Jackson (5)
| Oracle Arena19,596
| 5–2
|- style="background:#fbb;"
| 8
| November 11
| @ Sacramento
| 
| Morris & Jackson (16)
| Andre Drummond (17)
| Anthony Tolliver (4)
| Sleep Train Arena17,317
| 5–3
|- style="background:#fbb;"
| 9
| November 14
| @ L.A. Clippers
| 
| İlyasova & Jackson (20)
| Andre Drummond (19)
| Reggie Jackson (5)
| Staples Center19,060
| 5–4
|- style="background:#fbb;"
| 10
| November 15
| @ L.A. Lakers
| 
| Drummond & Dinwiddie (17)
| Andre Drummond (17)
| Spencer Dinwiddie (4)
| Staples Center18,997
| 5–5
|- style="background:#bfb;"
| 11
| November 17
| Cleveland
| 
| Andre Drummond (25)
| Andre Drummond (18)
| Reggie Jackson (12)
| Palace of Auburn Hills18,442
| 6–5
|- style="background:#bfb;"
| 12
| November 20
| @ Minnesota
| 
| Andre Drummond (21)
| Morris, Drummond & Baynes (11)
| Reggie Jackson (5)
| Target Center13,445
| 7–5
|- style="background:#fbb;"
| 13
| November 21
| Washington
| 
| Reggie Jackson (20)
| Andre Drummond (13)
| Reggie Jackson (9)
| Palace of Auburn Hills15,890
| 7–6
|- style="background:#fbb;"
| 14
| November 23
| @ Milwaukee
| 
| Kentavious Caldwell-Pope (17)
| Andre Drummond (15)
| Reggie Jackson (7)
| BMO Harris Bradley Center12,319
| 7–7
|- style="background:#bfb;"
| 15
| November 25
| Miami
| 
| Drummond & Jackson (18)
| Andre Drummond (20)
| Reggie Jackson (7)
| Palace of Auburn Hills15,119
| 8–7
|- style="background:#fbb;"
| 16
| November 27
| @ Oklahoma City
| 
| Marcus Morris (17)
| Andre Drummond (7)
| Steve Blake (7)
| Chesapeake Energy Arena18,203
| 8–8
|- style="background:#fbb;"
| 17
| November 29
| @ Brooklyn
| 
| Kentavious Caldwell-Pope (21)
| Andre Drummond (18)
| Reggie Jackson (9)
| Barclays Center12,823
| 8–9
|- style="background:#bfb;"
| 18
| November 30
| Houston
| 
| Reggie Jackson (31)
| Andre Drummond (13)
| Reggie Jackson (8)
| Palace of Auburn Hills14,818
| 9–9

|- style="background:#bfb;"
| 19
| December 2
| Phoenix
| 
| Reggie Jackson (34)
| Marcus Morris (14)
| Reggie Jackson (16)
| Palace of Auburn Hills13,985
| 10–9
|- style="background:#bfb;"
| 20
| December 4
| Milwaukee
| 
| Morris & Jackson (23)
| Andre Drummond (23)
| Reggie Jackson (5)
| Palace of Auburn Hills16,963
| 11–9
|- style="background:#bfb;"
| 21
| December 6
| L.A. Lakers
| 
| Kentavious Caldwell-Pope (22)
| Andre Drummond (15)
| Reggie Jackson (6)
| Palace of Auburn Hills16,394
| 12–9
|- style="background:#fbb;"
| 22
| December 7
| @ Charlotte
| 
| Kentavious Caldwell-Pope (16)
| Ersan İlyasova (13)
| Steve Blake (7)
| Time Warner Cable Arena15,481
| 12–10
|- style="background:#fbb;"
| 23
| December 9
| Memphis
| 
| Drummond & Jackson (18)
| Andre Drummond (19)
| Reggie Jackson (7)
| Palace of Auburn Hills13,411
| 12–11
|- style="background:#bfb;"
| 24
| December 11
| @ Philadelphia
| 
| Morris & Jackson (21)
| Andre Drummond (16)
| Morris, Jackson & Blake (4)
| Wells Fargo Center14,020
| 13–11
|- style="background:#bfb;"
| 25
| December 12
| Indiana
| 
| Reggie Jackson (21)
| Andre Drummond (11)
| Reggie Jackson (9)
| Palace of Auburn Hills14,858
| 14–11
|- style="background:#fbb;"
| 26
| December 14
| L.A. Clippers
| 
| Reggie Jackson (34)
| Andre Drummond (15)
| Reggie Jackson (7)
| Palace of Auburn Hills13,525
| 14–12
|- style="background:#bfb;"
| 27
| December 16
| Boston
| 
| Kentavious Caldwell-Pope (31)
| Andre Drummond (12)
| Caldwell-Pope & Jackson (3)
| Palace of Auburn Hills13,120
| 15–12
|- style="background:#bfb;"
| 28
| December 18
| @ Chicago
| 
| Andre Drummond (33)
| Andre Drummond (21)
| Reggie Jackson (13)
| United Center21,534
| 16–12
|- style="background:#bfb;"
| 29
| December 22
| @ Miami
| 
| Reggie Jackson (18)
| Andre Drummond (12)
| Morris, Caldwell-Pope, Jackson & Johnson (3)
| American Airlines Arena19,901
| 17–12
|-style="background:#fbb;"
| 30
| December 23
| @ Atlanta
| 
| Andre Drummond (25)
| Andre Drummond (12)
| Reggie Jackson (7)
| Philips Arena17,575
| 17–13
|-style="background:#fbb;"
| 31
| December 26
| Boston
| 
| Andre Drummond (22)
| Andre Drummond (22)
| Steve Blake (6)
| Palace of Auburn Hills18,288
| 17–14
|-style="background:#fbb;"
| 32
| December 29
| @ New York
| 
| Ersan İlyasova (19)
| Andre Drummond (9)
| Reggie Jackson (9)
| Madison Square Garden19,812
| 17–15
|- style="background:#bfb;"
| 33
| December 31
| Minnesota
| 
| Andre Drummond (23)
| Andre Drummond (18)
| Reggie Jackson (9)
| Palace of Auburn Hills15,475
| 18–15

|- style="background:#fbb;"
| 34
| January 2
| @ Indiana
| 
| Kentavious Caldwell-Pope (16)
| Andre Drummond (18)
| Reggie Jackson (5)
| Bankers Life Fieldhouse18,165
| 18–16
|- style="background:#bfb;"
| 35
| January 4
| Orlando
| 
| Kentavious Caldwell-Pope (21)
| Andre Drummond (12)
| Reggie Jackson (7)
| Palace of Auburn Hills14,301
| 19–16
|- style="background:#bfb;"
| 36
| January 6
| @ Boston
| 
| Reggie Jackson (24)
| Stanley Johnson (10)
| Reggie Jackson (6)
| TD Garden18,624
| 20–16
|- style="background:#bfb;"
| 37
| January 9
| Brooklyn
| 
| Drummond & Jackson (23)
| Ersan İlyasova (13)
| Reggie Jackson (8)
| Palace of Auburn Hills16,406
| 21–16
|- style="background:#fbb;"
| 38
| January 12
| San Antonio
| 
| Kentavious Caldwell-Pope (25)
| Andre Drummond (10)
| Reggie Jackson (11)
| Palace of Auburn Hills14,273
| 21–17
|- style="background:#fbb;"
| 39
| January 14
| @ Memphis
| 
| Stanley Johnson (19)
| Andre Drummond (11)
| Reggie Jackson (6)
| FedExForum15,977
| 21–18
|- style="background:#bfb;"
| 40
| January 16
| Golden State
| 
| Caldwell-Pope & Jackson (20)
| Andre Drummond (21)
| Reggie Jackson (8)
| Palace of Auburn Hills21,584
| 22–18
|- style="background:#fbb;"
| 41
| January 18
| Chicago
| 
| İlyasova & Jackson (19)
| Andre Drummond (16)
| Reggie Jackson (6)
| Palace of Auburn Hills18,935
| 22–19
|- style="background:#bfb;"
| 42
| January 20
| @ Houston
|  
| Caldwell-Pope & Morris (22)
| Andre Drummond (11)
| Reggie Jackson (9)
| Toyota Center17,203
| 23–19
|- style="background:#fbb;"
| 43
| January 21
| @ New Orleans
| 
| Kentavious Caldwell-Pope (23)
| Andre Drummond (22)
| Jackson & Jennings (5)
| Smoothie King Center15,281
| 23–20
|- style="background:#fbb;"
| 44
| January 23
| @ Denver
| 
| Marcus Morris (20)
| Baynes & Jennings (10)
| Reggie Jackson (8)
| Pepsi Center14,646
| 23–21
|- style="background:#bfb;"
| 45
| January 25
| @ Utah
| 
| Reggie Jackson (29)
| Ersan İlyasova (8)
| Morris, Jackson & Jennings (4)
| Vivint Smart Home Arena18,783
| 24–21
|- style="background:#bfb;"
| 46
| January 27
| Philadelphia
| 
| Reggie Jackson (27)
| Andre Drummond (18)
| 5 tied (3)
| Palace of Auburn Hills13,712
| 25–21
|- style="background:#fbb;"
| 47
| January 29
| Cleveland
| 
| Andre Drummond (20)
| Andre Drummond (8)
| Reggie Jackson (6)
| Palace of Auburn Hills21,012
| 25–22
|- style="background:#fbb;"
| 48
| January 30
| @ Toronto
| 
| Brandon Jennings (22)
| Andre Drummond (12)
| Morris & Baynes (2)
| Air Canada Centre19,800
| 25–23

|- style="background:#bfb;"
| 49
| February 1
| @ Brooklyn
| 
| Andre Drummond (21)
| Andre Drummond (18)
| Reggie Jackson (6)
| Barclays Center13,290
| 26–23
|- style="background:#fbb;"
| 50
| February 3
| @ Boston
| 
| Reggie Jackson (17)
| Andre Drummond (13)
| Reggie Jackson (7)
| TD Garden17,297
| 26–24
|- style="background:#bfb;"
| 51
| February 4
| New York
| 
| Stanley Johnson (22)
| Andre Drummond (13)
| Johnson & Jackson (5)
| Palace of Auburn Hills17,095
| 27–24
|- style="background:#fbb;"
| 52
| February 6
| @ Indiana
| 
| Reggie Jackson (26)
| Andre Drummond (13)
| Marcus Morris (4)
| Bankers Life Fieldhouse18,165
| 27–25
|- style="background:#fbb;"
| 53
| February 8
| Toronto
| 
| Ersan İlyasova (17)
| Andre Drummond (13)
| Marcus Morris (6)
| Palace of Auburn Hills14,103
| 27–26
|- style="background:#fbb;"
| 54
| February 10
| Denver
| 
| Marcus Morris (19)
| Andre Drummond (16)
| Morris & Hilliard (6)
| Palace of Auburn Hills19,971
| 27–27
|- align="center"
|colspan="9" bgcolor="#bbcaff"|All-Star Break
|- style="background:#fbb;"
| 55
| February 19
| @ Washington
| 
| Tobias Harris (21)
| Andre Drummond (13)
| Reggie Jackson (5)
| Verizon Center20,356
| 27–28
|- style="background:#fbb;"
| 56
| February 21
| New Orleans
| 
| Reggie Jackson (34)
| Andre Drummond (14)
| Steve Blake (5)
| Palace of Auburn Hills17,886
| 27–29
|- style="background:#bfb;"
| 57
| February 22
| @ Cleveland
| 
| Reggie Jackson (23)
| Andre Drummond (15)
| Jackson & Morris (4)
| Quicken Loans Arena20,562
| 28–29
|- style="background:#bfb;"
| 58
| February 24
| Philadelphia
| 
| Tobias Harris (22)
| Andre Drummond (18)
| Marcus Morris (8)
| Palace of Auburn Hills13,429
| 29–29
|- style="background:#bfb;"
| 59
| February 27
| @ Milwaukee
| 
| Reggie Jackson (22)
| Andre Drummond (17)
| Reggie Jackson (8) 
| BMO Harris Bradley Center17,165
| 30–29
|- style="background:#bfb;"
| 60
| February 28
| Toronto
| 
| Reggie Jackson (19)
| Andre Drummond (18)
| Reggie Jackson (8)  
| Palace of Auburn Hills17,201
| 31–29

|- style="background:#fbb;"
| 61
| March 2
| @ San Antonio
| 
| Morris & Harris (16)
| Andre Drummond (14)
| Harris & Blake (4)
| AT&T Center18,581
| 31–30
|- style="background:#fbb;"
| 62
| March 5
| @ New York
| 
| Andre Drummond (21)
| Andre Drummond (16)
| Reggie Jackson (6) 
| Madison Square Garden19,812
| 31–31
|- style="background:#bfb;"
| 63
| March 6
| Portland
| 
| Reggie Jackson (30)
| Andre Drummond (18)
| Reggie Jackson (9) 
| Palace of Auburn Hills18,386
| 32–31
|- style="background:#bfb;"
| 64
| March 9
| @ Dallas
| 
| Andre Drummond (25)
| Andre Drummond (17)
| Tobias Harris (5)
| American Airlines Center20,249
| 33–31
|- style="background:#fbb;"
| 65
| March 11
| @ Charlotte
| 
| Kentavious Caldwell-Pope (24)
| Andre Drummond (9)
| Reggie Jackson (10)
| Time Warner Cable Arena18,189
| 33–32
|- style="background:#bfb;"
| 66
| March 12
| @ Philadelphia
| 
| Reggie Jackson (24)
| Andre Drummond (15)
| Reggie Jackson (10)
| Wells Fargo Center16,087
| 34–32
|- style="background:#fbb;"
| 67
| March 14
| @ Washington
| 
| Kentavious Caldwell-Pope (18)
| Andre Drummond (12)
| Stanley Johnson (4)
| Verizon Center18,042
| 34–33
|- style="background:#fbb;"
| 68
| March 16
| Atlanta
| 
| Kentavious Caldwell-Pope (24)
| Andre Drummond (18)
| Reggie Jackson (10)
| Palace of Auburn Hills14,121
| 34–34
|- style="background:#bfb;"
| 69
| March 18
| Sacramento
| 
| Marcus Morris (24)
| Andre Drummond (11)
| Reggie Jackson (9)
| Palace of Auburn Hills15,982
| 35–34
|- style="background:#bfb;"
| 70
| March 19
| Brooklyn
| 
| Aron Baynes (21)
| Andre Drummond (9)
| Kentavious Caldwell-Pope (8)
| Palace of Auburn Hills17,559
| 36–34
|- style="background:#bfb;"
| 71
| March 21
| Milwaukee
| 
| Marcus Morris (21)
| Andre Drummond (16)
| Reggie Jackson (5)
| Palace of Auburn Hills13,577
| 37–34
|- style="background:#bfb;"
| 72
| March 23
| Orlando
| 
| Andre Drummond (30)
| Andre Drummond (14)
| Reggie Jackson (9)
| Palace of Auburn Hills16,609
| 38–34
|- style="background:#bfb;"
| 73
| March 25
| Charlotte
| 
| Kentavious Caldwell-Pope (21)
| Andre Drummond (14)
| Reggie Jackson (7)
| Palace of Auburn Hills17,209
| 39–34
|- style="background:#fbb;"
| 74
| March 26
| Atlanta
| 
| Tobias Harris (21)
| Andre Drummond (17)
| Steve Blake (6)
| Palace of Auburn Hills17,857
| 39–35
|- style="background:#bfb;"
| 75
| March 29
| Oklahoma City
| 
| Marcus Morris (24)
| Andre Drummond (15)
| Caldwell-Pope & Jackson (6)
| Palace of Auburn Hills18,201
| 40–35

|- style="background:#fbb;"
| 76
| April 1
| Dallas
| 
| Marcus Morris (31)
| Andre Drummond (17)
| Reggie Jackson (10)
| Palace of Auburn Hills19,031
| 40–36
|- style="background:#bfb;"
| 77
| April 2
| @ Chicago
| 
| Reggie Jackson (22)
| Andre Drummond (11)
| Harris, Drummond & Jackson (4)
| United Center22,197
| 41–36
|- style="background:#fbb;"
| 78
| April 5
| @ Miami
| 
| Harris & Jackson (21)
| Andre Drummond (13)
| Jackson & Blake (3)
| American Airlines Arena19,621
| 41–37
|- style="background:#bfb;"
| 79
| April 6
| @ Orlando
| 
| Reggie Jackson (24)
| Andre Drummond (16)
| Jackson & Blake (6)
| Amway Center16,553
| 42–37
|- style="background:#bfb;"
| 80
| April 8
| Washington
| 
| Reggie Jackson (39)
| Tobias Harris (9)
| Reggie Jackson (9)
| Palace of Auburn Hills18,207
| 43–37
|- style="background:#fbb;"
| 81
| April 12
| Miami
| 
| Kentavious Caldwell-Pope (17)
| Andre Drummond (18)
| Steve Blake (7)
| Palace of Auburn Hills18,575
| 43–38
|- style="background:#bfb;"
| 82
| April 13
| @ Cleveland
| 
| Jodie Meeks (20)
| Tolliver, Johnson & Bullock (8)
| Steve Blake (6)
| Quicken Loans Arena20,562
| 44–38

Playoffs

Game log

|- style="background:#fcc;"
| 1
| April 17
| @ Cleveland
| 
| Kentavious Caldwell-Pope (21)
| Andre Drummond (11)
| Reggie Jackson (7)
| Quicken Loans Arena20,562
| 0–1
|- style="background:#fcc;"
| 2
| April 20
| @ Cleveland
| 
| Andre Drummond (20)
| Harris & Caldwell-Pope (8)
| Reggie Jackson (6)
| Quicken Loans Arena20,562
| 0–2
|- style="background:#fcc;"
| 3
| April 22
| Cleveland
| 
| Kentavious Caldwell-Pope (18)
| Harris & Drummond (7)
| Reggie Jackson (12)
| The Palace of Auburn Hills21,584
| 0–3
|- style="background:#fcc;"
| 4
| April 24
| Cleveland
| 
| Marcus Morris (24)
| Tobias Harris (13)
| Reggie Jackson (12)
| The Palace of Auburn Hills21,584
| 0–4

Transactions

Overview

Trades

Free agency

Re-signed

Additions

Subtractions

Awards

References

Detroit Pistons seasons
Detroit Pistons
Detroit Pistons
Detroit Pistons